NGC 16 is a lenticular galaxy located in the Pegasus constellation. It was discovered on September the 8th 1784 by William Herschel.

In the Webb Society Deep-Sky Observer's Handbook,
  the visual appearance of NGC 16 is described as follows:
Round, with a slightly brighter centre; the outer nebulosity is of uniform surface brightness.

References

External links
 
 

Galaxies discovered in 1784
0016
NGC 16
NGC 16
00080
000660
17840908